Edwin William Schultz (1888 Wisconsin – 1971) was an American pathologist.

He graduated from Winona College with a BS, the University of Michigan (A.B. 1914) and from Johns Hopkins University with an MD. He served in a hospital in World War I. He taught at Stanford University, from 1920 to 1953.
He was a Guggenheim Fellow in 1925.
He was president of the American Association of Pathologists and Bacteriologists in 1956.

References

American pathologists
1888 births
1971 deaths
People from Wisconsin
Johns Hopkins School of Medicine alumni
University of Michigan alumni